John Ellis (1674 – July 1735) was a Welsh priest and antiquarian.

Life
Ellis was the second son of Thomas Ellis, from Llandegwning, Llŷn.  He was educated at Jesus College, Oxford, matriculating there on 31 March 1690 aged 16.  He obtained his Bachelor of Arts degree in 1693 and his Master of Arts degree in 1696. He was also appointed as a Fellow of Jesus College in 1696, holding this position until 1713.  In 1703, he obtained the degree of Bachelor of Divinity.  He was ordained deacon on 7 September 1707, with his ordination to the priesthood taking place on 4 July 1708.  He was then appointed rector of Llandwrog on 30 September 1710; in the same year, he was made a Canon of Bangor Cathedral. In 1713, he was made prebend of Llanfair Dyffryn Clwyd and surrendered his position at Bangor Cathedral.  On 24 July 1719, he became rector of Llanbedr-y-cennin and vicar of Caerhun.  His wife, Catherine (whom he married on 13 May 1720), was the step-sister of Humphrey Humphreys, Bishop of Bangor from 1689 to 1701.  Only one of their children survived infancy, also called John, becoming vicar of Bangor.  Ellis had a particular interest in antiquarian matters and assisted with Browne Willis's work A Survey of the Cathedral Church of Bangor in 1721, as Willis acknowledged. Ellis himself died at Llanbedr-y-cennin in July 1735 and was buried in the parish on 12 July 1735.

References

1634 births
1735 deaths
Alumni of Jesus College, Oxford
Fellows of Jesus College, Oxford
18th-century Welsh Anglican priests
Welsh antiquarians